The 1991 World Figure Skating Championships were held at the Olympiahalle in Munich, Germany from March 12 to 17. Medals were awarded in men's singles, ladies' singles, pair skating, and ice dancing.

Medal tables

Medalists

Medals by country

Results

Men
Kurt Browning won his third world championship in a row. Elvis Stojko (CAN) lands the first quad in combination, the first quadruple toe loop-double toe loop combination, at the World Championships.

Ladies
The U.S. became the first nation to ever sweep the ladies' podium at a World Championships.

Midori Ito and Laetitia Hubert collided with each other during a practice session. In the short program, Ito stumbled over an opening in the boards and into a camera but was back on the ice after three seconds. Tonya Harding became the first American woman to perform a triple axel at an international event.

Pairs

Ice dancing
The judges voted two couples (from Czechoslovakia and Poland) exactly the same (each 12 placings in compulsory dance 2). The event took place on 15th March 1991.

References

External links
 results
  
  
  
  

World Figure Skating Championships
World Figure Skating Championships
International figure skating competitions hosted by Germany